is a passenger railway station located in the town of in Miki, Kagawa, Japan.  It is operated by the private transportation company Takamatsu-Kotohira Electric Railroad (Kotoden) and is designated station "N10".

Lines

Layout
The station consists of a single side platform serving one bi-directional track. The station is unattended. The station entrance has slopes from both sides of the station waiting area to the east and west ends of the station.

Adjacent stations

History
Gakuen-dōri  Station opened on September 28, 2002

Surrounding area
 Kagawa Prefectural Miki High School
 Miki Town Office

Passenger statistics

See also
 List of railway stations in Japan

References

External links

  

Railway stations in Japan opened in 2002
Railway stations in Kagawa Prefecture
Miki, Kagawa